Patrick Michel (born 25 February 1970 in Saint-Tropez, France) is a French planetary scientist, Senior Researcher at CNRS (Centre National de la Recherche Scientifique), leader of the team TOP (Theories and Observations in Planetology) of the Lagrange Laboratory at the Côte d'Azur Observatory in Nice (France).

Studies 
Michel began his advanced education with a degree in Aeronautical Engineering and Space Techniques in 1993 where after he moved to the study of asteroids. He received his PhD in 1997 for a thesis titled "Dynamical evolution of Near-Earth Asteroids".

Academic topics 
He is specialist of the physical properties and the collisional and dynamical evolution of asteroids. His researches focus on the collisional processes between asteroids, the origin of near-Earth objects, binary asteroids, their physical properties, their response to various processes (impacts, tidal encounters, shaking) as a function of their internal and surface properties, and the risks of impacts with the Earth. His results have been the subject of more than 200 publications in refereed international journals, and have been featured on the covers of both Science and Nature.

Participations to space missions and mission concepts 
Michel is deeply involved in several space missions and mission concepts devoted to the investigation of small bodies and asteroid hazard.

NEOMAP committee and Don Quijote mission concept 
He belongs to the Near-Earth Object Mission Advisory Panel (NEOMAP) mandated by European Space Agency (ESA) to recommend space missions devoted to a better understanding of the impact threat. In 2004, the committee recommends the Don Quijote mission concept, which consists in making a test of asteroid deflection by using the technique of an artificial impactor. This mission was studied at ESA until 2007.

AIDA: DART and Hera 
He is leading the European science team of AIDA, for Asteroid Impact and Deflection Assessment, an international space cooperation inspired by Don Quichotte, a collaboration between ESA and NASA aimed at deflecting the secondary of the binary near-Earth asteroid Didymos using a kinetic impactor. AIDA will go into Phase A study at ESA and NASA in February 2015.

Hayabusa2 and OSIRIS-REx 
He is a co-I on both the JAXA Hayabusa2 and NASA OSIRIS-REx sample return missions to a primitive near-Earth asteroid. Hayabusa2 was launched successfully on December 3, 2014 and OSIRIS-REx will be launched in September 2016.

MMX 
Together with Dr Stephan Ulamec, they are the co-Principal Investigators of the rover developed in partnership by CNES and DLR for the JAXA MMX mission to return samples from Phobos, a moon of Mars, which will be launched in 2024 to arrive on Phobos in 2025 and return to Earth in 2029, with a deployment of the rover to perform in-situ surface analyses in 2026.

MarcoPolo-R 
He was a co-chair of the science study team of the MarcoPolo-R sample return mission during the assessment study phase (2011-2013) at the ESA.

Participations to activities financed by the European Commission

NEOShield and NEOShield-2 
He is also responsible of the Work Package on numerical simulations of collisions and asteroid deflection by a kinetic impactor in the European Consortiums NEOShield and NEOShield-2 funded, respectively, by the FP7 and the Horizon2020 framework programmes, by the European Commission (2012-2017).

NEO-MAPP 
He is the coordinator of the NEO-MAPP project, also under the Horizon2020 framework programme (2020-2023).

Roles in French and international organisations 
He has wide involvement in international organisations and belongs to the Science Program Committee of CNES (French space agency).

He has been elected Secretary of the Division 3 (Planetary Science) of the International Astronomical Union (IAU) in 2009-2012.

He also belongs to the Action Team 14 (AT14) of the COPUOS (for Committee On the Peaceful Uses of Outer Space) at the United Nations aimed at recommending actions and an international organisation to deal with the asteroid impact threat and to the Steering Committee of the International Asteroid Warning Network (IAWN) recommended by AT14.

Media 
He actively contributes to public outreach and is regularly solicited by various media to participate in French TV shows, radio shows and magazine interviews, and to contribute to the writing of papers in popular journals on topics related to small celestial body hazards, space missions and planetary formation (cf. external links).

Michel is the lead editor of the book Asteroids IV published in 2015 by the University of Arizona Press.

Awards 
In 2006 he received the "Young Researcher" prize from the French Society of Astronomy and Astrophysics.

In 2012, he was awarded the Carl Sagan Medal from the American Astronomical Society.

In 2013 he was awarded the International Prize Paolo Farinella in Planetary Science from the University of Pisa in recognition of his work on the collisional process.

Asteroid (7561) PatrickMichel was named in his honour by the IAU.

References

External links 

 (in French and in English) Patrick Michel's page on his observatory website
 Researchgate.net profile page of Patrick Michel
  TOP Team
 NEOMAP Committee, the NEO Mission Advisory Panel (ESA web site) 
  Patrick Michel, astrophysicien (audio), Ciel et Espace radio podcasts, un métier, une passion, Patrick Michel
 (in French) interview d'un chercheur du laboratoire lagrange (Patrick Michel) sur la RTS (CNRS Côte d'Azur web site)
 (in French) Entretien avec Patrick Michel investigateur principal de la mission Hera (ESA web site)
 Simulation of asteroid spin creating binary asteroids (ESA web site)
 Patrick Michel: Where do asteroids come from? on ESA website
 Presentation by Patrick Michel (IAC2022, plenary panel on planetary defence) on Vimeo web site
 NEO Working Group, some new knowledge regarding NEOs, current projects and perspectives (IAU web site)

1970 births
Living people
European Space Agency personnel
Planetary scientists